Martin T. Causer is an American politician serving as a Republican member of the Pennsylvania House of Representatives for the 67th District and was elected in 2002. He currently serves on the House Commerce, Environmental Resources and Energy and Veterans Affairs and Emergency Preparedness Committees.  He was named Republican Chairman of the Subcommittee on Parks and Forests within the Environmental Resources and Energy Committee, and of the Subcommittee on Programs and Benefits of the Aging and Older Adult Services Committee.

Personal
Causer graduated from the University of Pittsburgh at Bradford, earning a bachelor's degree in history and political science.  He currently lives in Turtlepoint, in Annin Township. Causer has three children.

References

External links
Representative Causer's official web site
Pennsylvania House profile

1973 births
Living people
Republican Party members of the Pennsylvania House of Representatives
People from McKean County, Pennsylvania
University of Pittsburgh alumni
21st-century American politicians